Cobalt(II) chlorate is a chemical compound with the formula Co(ClO3)2.
It is formed by a double displacement reaction between cobalt(II) sulfate and barium chlorate, barium sulfate precipitates and cobalt chlorate can be crystallized out of the filtrate.

 CoSO4 + Ba(ClO3)2 → BaSO4 + Co(ClO3)2

It is also possible to make it by the reaction of any chlorate with a cobalt(II) salt, however the pure product is harder to separate.

It is an oxidant, as are all chlorates.

References

Cobalt(II) compounds
Chlorates
Oxidizing agents